The bağlama or saz is a family of plucked string instruments, long-necked lutes used in Ottoman classical music, Turkish folk music, Turkish Arabesque music, Azerbaijani music, Kurdish music, Armenian music and in parts of Syria, Iraq and the Balkan countries.

Bağlama is Turkish from bağlamak, "to tie". Saz means "to make; to compose" in Persian. Saz is French.
According to The New Grove Dictionary of Music and Musicians, "the terms 'bağlama' and 'saz' are used somewhat interchangeably in Turkey."
Turkish Baglama is an instrument which originated in Iran. It is similar to Iranian string instruments such as tanbur or dutar. Like the Western lute and the Middle-Eastern oud, it has a deep round back, but a much longer neck. It can be played with a plectrum or with a fingerpicking style known as şelpe.

In the music of Greece the name baglamas is given to a treble bouzouki, a related instrument. The Turkish settlement of Anatolia from the late eleventh century onward saw the introduction of a two-string Iranian  dutar that Turkmen people adopted which in turn was played in some areas of Turkey until recent times.

Turkish bağlama
The most commonly used string folk instrument in Turkey, the bağlama has seven strings divided into courses of two, two and three. It can be tuned in various ways and takes different names according to region and size: Bağlama, Divan Sazı, Bozuk, Çöğür, Kopuz Irızva, Cura, Tambura, etc. The cura is the smallest member of the bağlama family: larger than the cura is the tambura, tuned an octave lower. The Divan sazı, the largest instrument in the family, is tuned one octave lower still.

A bağlama has three main parts, the bowl (called tekne), made from mulberry wood or juniper, beech, spruce or walnut, the spruce sound board (göğüs) and a neck of beech or juniper (sap). The tuning pegs are known as burgu (literally screw). Frets are tied to the sap with fishing line, which allows them to be adjusted. The bağlama is usually played with a mızrap or tezene (similar to a guitar pick) made from cherrywood bark or plastic. In some regions, it is played with the fingers in a style known as Şelpe or Şerpe.

There are also electric bağlamas, which can be connected to an amplifier. These can have either single or double pickups.

Azerbaijani saz 
The Azerbaijani saz was mainly used by Ashiqs. The art of Azerbaijani Ashiqs combines poetry, storytelling, dance and vocal and instrumental music into a traditional performance art. This art is one of the symbols of Azerbaijani culture and considered an emblem of national identity and the guardian of Azerbaijani language, literature and music.

Characterized by the accompaniment of the kopuz, a stringed musical instrument, the classical repertoire of Azerbaijani Ashiqs includes 200 songs, 150 literary-musical compositions known as dastans, nearly 2,000 poems and numerous stories.

Since 2009 the art of Azerbaijani Ashiqs has been inscribed on the Representative List of the Intangible Cultural Heritage of Humanity.

The kopuz and the bağlama

The bağlama is a synthesis of historical musical instruments in Central Asia and pre-Turkish Anatolia. It is partly descended from the Turkic komuz. The kopuz, or komuz, differs from the bağlama in that it has a leather-covered body and two or three strings made of sheep gut, wolf gut, or horsehair. It is played with the fingers rather than a plectrum and has a fingerboard without frets. Bağlama literally translates as "something that is tied up", probably a reference to the tied-on frets of the instrument. The word bağlama is first used in 18th-century texts. The French traveler Jean Benjamin de Laborde, who visited Turkey during that century, recorded that "the bağlama or tambura is in form exactly like the cogur, but smaller." The Çoğur/Çöğur was in many ways a transitional Instrument between old Komuz and new Bağlama style and has a body shape similar to the Instrument called panduri in Georgia.

According to the historian Hammer, metal strings were first used on a type of komuz with a long fingerboard known as the kolca kopuz in 15th-century Anatolia. This was the first step in the emergence of the çöğür (cogur), a transitional instrument between the komuz and the bağlama. According to 17th-century writer Evliya Çelebi, the cogur was first made in the city of Kütahya in western Turkey. To take the strain of the metal strings the leather body was replaced with wood, the fingerboard was lengthened and frets were introduced. Instead of five hair strings there were now twelve metal strings arranged in four groups of three. Today, the cogur is smaller than a medium-size bağlama.

Bağlama (Saz) family

Bağlama tunings
There are three string groups, or courses, on the bağlama, with strings double or tripled. These string groups can be tuned in a variety of ways, known as düzen (literally, "order"). For the bağlama düzeni, the most common tuning, the courses are tuned from top downward, A-G-D. Some other düzens are Kara Düzen (C-G-D), Misket Düzeni (A-D-F#), Müstezat (A-D-F), Abdal Düzeni, and Rast Düzeni.

 Bağlama düzeni (La, Sol, Re) (A, G, D)
 Bozuk düzen, kara düzen (Sol, Re, La) (G, D, A)
 Misket düzeni (Fa#, Re, La) (F#, D, A)
 Fa müstezat düzeni (Fa, Re, La) (F, D, A)
 Abdal düzeni (La, La, Sol) (A, A, G)
 Zurna düzeni (Re, Re, La) (D, D, A)
 Do müstezat düzeni (Sol, Do, La) (G, C, A)
 Aşık düzeni (La (bottom string set), Re (middle string set), Mi (Top string set) (A, D, E)

Bağlama scale

The musical scale of the bağlama differs from that of many western instruments – such as the guitar – in that it features ratios that are close to quarter tones. The traditional ratios for bağlama frets are listed by Yalçın Tura:

Fret 1: 18/17
Fret 2: 12/11
Fret 3: 9/8
Fret 4: 81/68
Fret 5: 27/22
Fret 6: 81/64
Fret 7: 4/3
Fret 8: 24/17
Fret 9: 16/11
Fret 10: 3/2
Fret 11: 27/17
Fret 12: 18/11
Fret 13: 27/16
Fret 14: 16/9
Fret 15: 32/17
Fret 16: 64/33
Fret 17: 2/1

However, as confirmed by Okan Öztürk, instrument makers now often set frets on the bağlama with the aid of fret calculators and tuners based on the 24-tone equal temperament.

Notable performers

 Pir Sultan Abdal 
 Karacaoğlan
 Dadaloğlu
 Gevheri
 Aşık Veysel (1894–1973)
 Muharrem Ertaş (1913–1984)
 Neşet Ertaş (1938–2012)
 Ali Ekber Çiçek (1935–2006)
 Ruhi Su (1915-1982)
 Hasret Gültekin (1971-1993)
 Ahmet Kaya (1957-2000)
 Aşık Mahzuni Şerif (1940-2002)
 Musa Eroğlu
 Erdal Erzincan
  Erdinç Ecevit Yıldız
 Orhan Gencebay
 Güler Duman
 Ahmet Koç
 Erkan Oğur
 Arif Sağ
 Muhlis Akarsu (1948-1993)
 Nesimi Çimen (1931-1993)
 Cahit Berkay

See also

 Alevism
 Art of Azerbaijani Ashiqs
 Baglamas
 Bouzouki (Greece)
 Buzuq (Lebanon & Syria)
 Çiftelia
 Dombra
 Dutar
 Hicaz Hümâyun Saz Semâisi
 Innaby, Azerbaijani dance
 Komuz
 Music of Turkey
 Sallaneh (lute)
 Šargija
 Setar
 Tambura (instrument)
 Tanbur

References

External links
Article about documentary featuring the saz: "From Berlin to Khorasan: seeking the roots of saz music"

Azerbaijani musical instruments
Turkish folk music instruments
Necked bowl lutes
Armenian musical instruments
Bosnian musical instruments
Macedonian musical instruments
Turkmen musical instruments
Turkish words and phrases
Turkish inventions
Kurdish musical instruments